A Broken Doll is a 1921 American silent drama film directed by Allan Dwan and starring Monte Blue, Mary Thurman and Mary Jane Irving.

Cast
 Monte Blue as Tommy Dawes 
 Mary Thurman as Harriet Bundy 
 Mary Jane Irving as Rosemary 
 Les Bates as Bill Nyall 
 Lizette Thorne as Mrs. Nyell 
 Arthur Millett as Sheriff Hugh Bundy 
 Jack Riley as Knapp Wyant

References

Bibliography
 Frederic Lombardi. Allan Dwan and the Rise and Decline of the Hollywood Studios. McFarland, 2013.

External links
 

1921 films
1921 drama films
1920s English-language films
American silent feature films
Silent American drama films
American black-and-white films
Films directed by Allan Dwan
1920s American films